The 2020 season was the eighth season in the existence of UKM Football Club and the club's third consecutive season in the Malaysia Premier League.

Season events
On 24 February 2020, the club has announced the players for 2020 season.

On 16 December 2020, Football Association of Malaysia has decided to reject the club appeals after finding that the documents submitted showed the club did not have the financial standings to survive for one season.

Players

Competitions

Malaysia Premier League

League table

Statistics

Appearances and goals

|-
!colspan="14"|Players who left UKM during the season:

|}

References

UKM